Native holly is a common name for several Australian plants and may refer to:

Alchornea ilicifolia, in the family Euphorbiaceae
Lomatia ilicifolia, in the family Proteaceae
Platylobium obtusangulum, in the family Fabaceae